is a 2019 Japanese animated superhero film based on an original story featuring the characters of My Hero Academia manga series by Kōhei Horikoshi. Produced by Bones and distributed by Toho, the second film of the franchise was directed by Kenji Nagasaki from a script written by Yōsuke Kuroda and stars Daiki Yamashita and Nobuhiko Okamoto as part of an ensemble cast. In the film, taking place after the Meta Liberation Army arc of the manga, Izuku Midoriya and his classmates visits Nabu Island where they must save a group of islanders from a villain with an unfathomable Quirk.

A second film of the franchise was announced in March 2019, with the staff and cast from the first film returning. The film has elements to its story that were once going to be used by Horikoshi as a finale to the series. It was intended to be the last film in the series until images of a possible third film appeared online.

The film was released in Japan on December 20, 2019, and in North America on February 26, 2020. The film grossed over $29 million worldwide and received positive reviews from critics. A third film, My Hero Academia: World Heroes' Mission, was released in Japan on August 6, 2021.

Plot
The League of Villains is pursued by several Heroes while driving off in a truck carrying a life support capsule. Endeavor arrives and manages to destroy the truck, with the villains revealed to be clones created by Twice as it crashes, but he and Hawks find it empty. The figure within the capsule, a villain named Nine who allowed himself to be experimented on by Daruma Ujiko, escaped during the crash and regroups with his team of villains to fulfill their dream to create a society ruled by those with strong Quirks, but while Ujiko gave him a copy of All for One's Quirk to acquire eight more Quirks besides his weather ability. 

Nine needs a special Cell Activation Quirk to cure himself of a terminal disease that worsened as a side-effect of his modification. U.A. High's Class 1-A has been sent to the remote Nabu Island as part of a winter semester safety program. Izuku Midoriya, the current wielder of One for All, meets Mahoro Shimano and her younger brother Katsuma, residents of the island. Bonding with them along with his rival Katsuki Bakugo, they discover that Katsuma wishes to become a hero despite Mahoro seeking to dissuade him. Meanwhile, Mahoro and Katsuma's father is attacked by Nine's group with his Quirk stolen, but the Quirk is incompatible with Nine's blood type with the villain surmising that the man's children might possess a better variant. 

Nine's gang arrives on the island and destroy all means of escape and communication. Class 1-A learns of the invasion and split up to stop the villains and protect the island's residents. Nine finds the children and confirms Katsuma possesses the Quirk he seeks as Midoriya intervenes. Nine ends up greatly overpowering Midoriya with his multitude of Quirks, even with Bakugo's help, and they are taken out of commission. However, Nine is forced to fallback after overusing his Quirks, with the rest of 1-A saving Midoriya, Bakugo, and the Shimanos. Class 1-A regroups, and after Katsuma uses his Quirk to heal the unconscious Midoriya and Bakugo, they decide to attack the villains head-on while awaiting the arrival of other heroes. 

After evacuating the islanders, the class successfully separates Nine from his gang, with them each being defeated by the students. However, Nine is successfully able to incapacitate all the remaining students, and once again overpowering Midoriya and Bakugo by ingesting Quirk-empowering fluids, threatening to destroy the island. Seeing no other way to defeat Nine, Midoriya transfers One For All into Bakugo, while he uses its leftover embers. Together, Midoriya and Bakugo finally defeat Nine, with Midoriya's One For All seemingly fading afterward. 

As professional heroes arrive, All Might finds an unconscious Bakugo and Midoriya, and realizes that One For All remains within Midoriya, as the transfer into Bakugo was interrupted, theorizing that the previous wielders of One For All wish for Midoriya to keep it. Elsewhere, Tomura Shigaraki finds and kills the weakened Nine out of spite. With Nine's gang apprehended, the class help repair the damage done to the island before returning home. Midoriya and Bakugo, who had lost the memory of wielding One For All, say goodbye to Katsuma and Mahoro, as Midoriya assures Katsuma he can become a hero, just like All Might had done for him previously.

Voice cast

Production
On March 23, 2019, a stage event at AnimeJapan 2019 announced that a second My Hero Academia film was planned for a "winter 2019" release, with Kōhei Horikoshi responsible for supervision and original character design. On July 7, 2019, the title and release date were revealed at the "Hero Fes." event, with Horikoshi stating the film would be the last film adaptation for the series. The event also revealed that Bones would be producing the film, with Kenji Nagasaki returning as director, Yōsuke Kuroda returning as writer, Yoshihiko Umakoshi returning as character designer, and Yuki Hayashi returning as composer. On October 11, 2019, it was announced that Tomoyo Kurosawa would be joining the cast as Mahoro, and Yuka Terasaki would be voicing Katsuma. On September 26, 2019, it was announced that Mio Imada had been cast as Slice, and Yoshio Inoue had been cast as Nine. On November 11, 2019, Weekly Shōnen Jump revealed that Kohsuke Toriumi and Shunsuke Takeuchi had been cast as villains Mummy and Chimera respectively, and on December 6, 2019, it was revealed that Yuichi Nakamura would voice Hawks.

Music
The film was composed by Yuki Hayashi, who previously doing so for My Hero Academia anime series and My Hero Academia: Two Heroes. In October 2019, sumika was revealed to be performing the theme song for the film titled . The film's original soundtrack was released in Japan by Toho Animation Records on December 18, 2019, and in the United States by Milan Records on July 17, 2020. Milan Records released the original soundtrack on vinyl records in the United States in October 2020.

Release

Theatrical
Toho released the film theatrically in Japan on December 20, 2019. The first one million audience members to see the film received a bonus manga booklet written by Horikoshi, titled "Vol. Rising", with the booklet containing an extended interview with Horikoshi, character designs and sketches. The film also received 4D screenings across 81 theaters in Japan on January 24, 2020.

Funimation announced that it had licensed the film for English-speaking regions, and released the film in North America on February 26, 2020 in both English subtitled and dubbed formats. Manga Entertainment announced that it would release the film in the United Kingdom and Ireland, with the theatrical release from February 26 and 27, 2020 in both English subtitled and dubbed. In Australia and New Zealand, Madman Anime premiered the film at Anime Festival Sydney on March 7 and 8, 2020 in English subtitled and dubbed respectively, with a wide release on March 12, 2020. Funimation provided MX4D screenings in select theaters in the United States, and Madman provided 4DX screenings in Sydney with the English dub.

On March 3, 2021, PVR Pictures announced that the film would get a theatrical release in India on March 12, 2021.

Home media
My Hero Academia: Heroes Rising was released on Blu-ray and DVD in Japan on July 15, 2020 in a "Complete Edition", that includes new scenes not seen during the theatrical release. Then, on July 15, 2020, the North American Blu-ray was officially listed for pre-order, with a release date of October 27, 2020. Netflix began streaming the film in India and the Philippines on May 15, 2021.

Reception

Box office

During the opening weekend, My Hero Academia: Heroes Rising ranked third at the Japanese box office, earning  in its first three days,  of which during the weekend. The film remained 3rd for the second weekend, dropped to 4th in its third week, dropped to 7th in its fourth weekend, and left the top 10 in its fifth weekend, though briefly rising to 9th in its sixth weekend before leaving the top 10 again. The film surpassed My Hero Academia: Two Heroes during its ninth weekend.

In the United States, the film made $2.47 million from 1,275 theaters on its first day (topping the box office), and $815,000 on its second. It went on to debut to $5.1 million in its opening weekend (a five-day total of $8.5 million), finishing fourth.

Critical response
The website's critical consensus reads, "My Hero Academia: Heroes Rising sends fans of the saga on an exhilarating adventure that ends the series on a beautifully animated high note." On Metacritic, the film has a weighted average score of 70 out of 100, based on nine critics, indicating "generally favorable reviews." American audiences polled by PostTrak gave it an average 5 out of 5 stars, with 73% of people saying they would definitely recommend it.

Anime News Network's Richard Eisenbeis praised the setting, concept and climax, stating that the climax was "insanely impactful", though criticized the film's position in the My Hero Academia timeline, causing confusion and therefore "[draining] the film's tension". Twwk of Beneath the Tangles agreed about the confusing elements while stating that the film "may not reinvent or add anything new to the genre, but it is fun, fan-pleasing, and above all, meaningful, a heightened and focused tale infused with the characters, superpowers, and heart that series fans have come to love." Daryl Harding from Crunchyroll News praised the animation, stating "the final fight animation was some of the series’ best", but criticized the side-story nature of the film, saying that "the world-ending stakes in it felt lessened" due to viewers knowing the continuity of the series.

Notes

References

External links
 

2010s Japanese superhero films
2019 anime films
2019 films
Anime films based on manga
Bones (studio)
Films scored by Yuki Hayashi
Films with screenplays by Yōsuke Kuroda
Funimation
Japanese animated superhero films
2010s Japanese-language films
My Hero Academia
Toho animated films